Malič (Serbian Cyrillic: Малич) is a mountain in western Serbia, near the town of Ivanjica. Its highest peak has an elevation of 1,110 meters above sea level.

References

External links
Paragliding site Malič
Photo gallery, Mountaineering society "Žeželj"

Mountains of Serbia